The Lac de l'Orignal (in English: Moose Lake) is a lake located on the territory of the village of Nantes, near Lac-Mégantic in Estrie, in Quebec, in Canada. The lake is crossed by the Glen River which joins the Chaudière River and is a sub-tributary of the St. Lawrence River.

Geography 

Its area is 45 acres. The Lake is accessible by rang 10 which joins the "Chemin du Lac de L'Orignal" and runs along part of the lake. Most of the land is private and inhabited. The lake is adjacent to a marsh to the west, which is crossed by the Glen River.

References 

Lakes of Estrie
Le Granit Regional County Municipality